DHL Freight is a division of Deutsche Post DHL providing road and rail freight services across Europe, parts of the Commonwealth of Independent States (CIS), North Africa and the Middle East. Together with DHL Global Forwarding (formerly DHL Danzas), it forms Deutsche Post's Freight/Forwarding business division.

DHL
German companies established in 2007